"America's Sweetheart" is a song recorded by American singer and songwriter Elle King for her debut studio album, Love Stuff (2015). King co-wrote the song with its producer, Martin Johnson. It serves as the album's second mainstream single and the third overall (promoted concurrently with rock single "Under the Influence"), and was serviced to hot adult contemporary radio in the United States through RCA Records on February 8, 2016.

Composition
"America's Sweetheart" is a country pop and country rock song instrumented predominantly by the banjo with a beat influenced by electronic dance music. The song's lyrics speak to the idea of nonconformity, with King outlining her unique qualities that conflict with the ideal persona of "America's sweetheart" and asserting that she refuses to change for anyone. King employs a belting technique on the chorus.

Live performances
King performed "America's Sweetheart" during appearances on The Ellen DeGeneres Show and The Tonight Show Starring Jimmy Fallon, both airing February 11, 2016.

Chart performance

Weekly charts

Year end charts

Certifications and sales

Release history

References

2015 songs
2016 singles
Elle King songs
RCA Records singles
Songs written by Martin Johnson (musician)